Sam Wong may refer to:
 Chi Hong (Sam) Wong, general authority of the Church of Jesus Christ of Latter-day Saints
 Sam Wong (windsurfer), Hong Kong windsurfer

See also
 Samuel Wong, American conductor and physician
 Samuel Wong (politician), Hong Kong politician